Clair-Louise Fearnley (born 7 March 1975) is an Australian former long-distance runner. She competed in the women's 10,000 metres at the 2000 Summer Olympics.

References

External links
 

1975 births
Living people
Athletes (track and field) at the 2000 Summer Olympics
Australian female long-distance runners
Olympic athletes of Australia
Sportspeople from Halifax, West Yorkshire
Commonwealth Games medallists in athletics
Commonwealth Games bronze medallists for Australia
Athletes (track and field) at the 1998 Commonwealth Games
20th-century Australian women
21st-century Australian women
Medallists at the 1998 Commonwealth Games